Octomeria aloefolia is a species of orchid endemic to eastern Brazil.

References

External links 

aloefolia
Endemic orchids of Brazil